Henrik Lundberg (born 14 January 1991) is a Swedish ice hockey goaltender. He is currently playing with Örebro HK of the Swedish Hockey League (SHL).

Lundberg made his Swedish Hockey League debut playing with Örebro HK during the 2013–14 SHL season.

References

External links

1991 births
Living people
Örebro HK players
Swedish ice hockey goaltenders
Ice hockey people from Gothenburg